Ken Vuagnoux (born 25 July 1995) is a French snowboarder. He competed in the 2018 Winter Olympics.

References

1995 births
Living people
Snowboarders at the 2018 Winter Olympics
French male snowboarders
Olympic snowboarders of France
Sportspeople from Nice
Université Savoie-Mont Blanc alumni
Competitors at the 2015 Winter Universiade
21st-century French people